Joseph J. Cahill (February 18, 1857 – February 16, 1934) was an American politician from New York.

Life 
Cahill was born on February 18, 1857, in Brooklyn, New York, the son of John Cahill and Susan Brackley. His parents were Irish immigrants.

After attending St. Francis Xavier's College in Manhattan, Cahill worked with his father in the produce business and was a member of the Produce Exchange. He later joined the liquor business.

In 1890, Cahill was elected to the New York State Assembly as a Democrat, representing the Kings County 1st District. He served in the Assembly in 1891, 1892, 1893, and 1894.

After he left the Assembly, Cahill had a saloon at 413 Henry Street. In 1905, he was arrested and found guilty of voter registration fraud. After trying to appeal the case for nearly 3 years, he was given a two-year sentence in Sing Sing prison.

Cahill's wife was Margaret Hogan, and they had two sons and two daughters. He died on February 16, 1934, in Frank J. Quayle Jr.'s office at the Hotel St. George. He was buried in Holy Cross Cemetery.

References

External links 

 The Political Graveyard

1857 births
1934 deaths
Xavier High School (New York City) alumni
American people of Irish descent
Politicians from Brooklyn
Inmates of Sing Sing
19th-century American politicians
Democratic Party members of the New York State Assembly
Burials at Holy Cross Cemetery, Brooklyn